Mavjinjava is a small village near Bagasara in the Amreli district of the Saurashtra region in the state of Gujarat, India. There is a population of around 3,754 people in Mavjinjava. More than 3000 people live outside of Manjinjava in places like Surat, Ahmedabad & Mumbai.

History
It is believed that during the year 534 AD Mavjinjava existed and was known as Mavji and then Mavjinjava. The village is named in ancient Gujrati as Mavjinjava (માવજીંજવા). Initially Mavjinjava was the part of the former Gaekwad of Baroda during the Gaekwad regime in 1886. After Indian independence in 1947, the village became the part of Bombay State and then a separate village in Gujarat State after the division of Bombay State in 1956 into Gujarat and Maharashtra.

Geography
Most part of the area is called Balapur Road stretching from the main bus stand to Mahesh Pan Center. Other areas are Khodiyar Plot, Bagasara Plot, Kalwachouk, Pati Khetar Road, Hanumanpara etc.

Mavjinjava is a small village in Kāthiāwār in Gujarāt. The Kāthiāwār peninsula of western India, is in Gujarāt State. The peninsula extends southwest into the Arabian Sea and is bounded on the northwest by the Gulf of Kachchh and on the southeast by the Gulf of Khambhāt. The area of Mavjinjava is about 60,000 km² (about 23,000 sq mi).

Climate

Mavjinjava has a semi-arid climate, with hot, dry summers from mid-March to mid-June and the wet monsoon season from mid-June to October, when the village receives 500 mm of rain on average. The months from November to February are mild, the average temperature being around 20 °C, with low humidity.

Culture
The people in Mavjinjava are predominantly vegetarians and are vehemently against any form of hunting.

Landmarks

Mavjinjava has many historical landmarks to visit, including: 
 The K.Lal's Home, 
 Sri Nirdoshanand Saraswati Ji Maharaj Ashram, 
 Ramji Mandir, 
 Sri Bal Krishna Haveli, 
 Shivalaya Mandir, 
 Karmanpir Mandir.

Sports
Cricket is a very famous sport in this village.

Media 
Many media found in this village.

Newspapers 
Morning newspapers available in the Gujarati language are Gujarat Samachar, Sandesh, Divya Bhaskar, Avadh Times etc.

Satellite Television
Airtel digital TV, Dish TV, Reliance Digital TV, TATA Play.

Television
Prasar Bharti telecasts DD National (DD1), DD Gujarati (DD11) from Doordarshan Kendra, Rajkot. BSNL Telephone Exchange provides PSTN, mobile, wireless local loop and broadband services. Private companies like Idea cellular, Reliance Infocomm, Bharti Airtel and Vodafone India also provide mobile and broadband services.

Telecommunications
Airtel, BSNL, Idea Cellular, Reliance Mobile, Vodafone, Jio.

Festival

Garba, a dance form, is popular both with men and women and is performed during the Navratri festival. The dance starts before midnight and continues until dawn. Mata Ambe, who rides a Lion, has a special reverential status with any highly religious Gujarati. Diwali is the New Year for Hindus and people celebrate by doing Ma Laxmi Pujan. People clean and paint their houses and purchase new clothes to wear on New Year's Day. Dhuleti is the colour festival and Mahashivratri is God Shiva's day. People also celebrate Uttarayan (Makar Sankranti) on 14 January by flying kites from their terraces. Other holidays are Ganesh Utsava, Ram Navami, Mahavir Jayanti etc.

Economy 
Mavjinjava village economy depends on agriculture.

Banks 
 Bank of Baroda.
 Karmanpir Street.
 Amreli Jilla Madhya Sahakari Bank.
 Bagasara Road, Near Khodal Dham temple.

Education 
 Mavjinjava had many small children Play House.
Mavjinjava had one Primary School
 Shree Mavjinjava Primary School
Mavjinjava had one Secondary School
 Shree K.Lal High School

Transport

Mavjinjava village is connected to major Indian cities by road.

Roads and Highways
Mavjinjava village is very well connected with Gujarat State roads.

Distances between other Cities
Distances from Mavjinjava to...
 Bagasara ➤ 9.0 km.
 Amreli ➤ 41.1 km.
 Junagadh ➤ 70.9 km.
 Rajkot ➤ 102 km.
 Bhavnagar ➤ 159 km.
 Bhuj ➤ 334 km.
 Ahmedabad ➤ 281 km.
 Vadodara ➤ 321 km.
 Surat ➤ 461 km.
 Mumbai ➤ 723 km.
 Pune ➤ 855 km.
 Bangalore ➤ 1,689 km.
 Kolkata ➤ 2,329 km.
 Delhi ➤ 1,210 km.
 Jaipur ➤ 950 km.
 Chennai ➤ 2,042 km.
 Goa ➤ 1,310 km.
 Srinagar ➤ 1,931 km.

Rail and Internal Transport
Nearly Railway Station is Amreli, Junagadh & Rajkot.

Airport
Nearly national airport is Rajkot and international airport is Ahmedabad and Mumbai.

Attractions 
 Sri Swami Nirdoshanand Saraswatiji Maharaj Ashram
 Ramji Mandir
 Sri Bal Krishna Haveli
 Shivalaya Mandir
 Karmanpir Mandir
 Swaminarayan Mandir
 Balaji Hanuman Mandir
 Hanuman Deri
 Khodiyarmata Mandir
 Khodiyar Dham
 Sanatan Gaushala
 Great Magician K.Lal's Home
 Monsoon time Mavjinjava River.

Famous people
K'LAL Magician, a world-famous magician born in Mavjinjava Village.

Saint Shree Karaman Peer a famous holly devine person.

Demographics

 India census, Mavjinjava had a population of 3,754.

References

Villages in Amreli district